Pavlovce may refer to: 

Pavlovce, Rimavská Sobota District, a municipality in southern Slovakia
Pavlovce (Vranov nad Topľou District), a municipality in eastern Slovakia
Pavlovce nad Uhom, a municipality in eastern Slovakia